Ioesse sanguinolenta is a species of beetle in the family Cerambycidae. It was described by James Thomson in 1864. It is known from Malaysia.

References

Petrognathini
Beetles described in 1864